Abdullah Pasha or Abdullah Kölemen (1846–1937) was an Ottoman general in the First Balkan War, notable as the Ottoman commander in the Battle of Kirk Kilisse in 1912, the Battle of Lule Burgas, and the Battle of Adrianople (1913) in which the Ottoman forces were defeated by the Bulgarians.

He was the Minister of War of the Ottoman Empire for 38 days between 11 November and 19 December 1918 in the cabinet of Ahmet Tevfik Pasha. He died in 1937 in İzmir.

References

External links
 "National Scapegoat" - The Montreal Gazette
 "Commander's Plight" - The Montreal Gazette
 "The War in Egypt" - Nelson Evening Mail

1846 births
1937 deaths
People from Trabzon
Ottoman Military Academy alumni
Ottoman Military College alumni
Ottoman Army generals
Pashas
Ottoman military personnel of the Balkan Wars
Grand Crosses of the Order of Vasa